James Page (born April 1, 1971 in Pittsburg, CA, United States) is a former professional boxer in the welterweight (147lb) division.

Pro boxing career

Nicknamed "Mighty Quinn", Page turned pro in 1990 and beat Andrei Pestriaev in 1998 to capture the Vacant WBA Welterweight Title. He defended the title three times until he was stripped, in 2000, for failing to turn up for a mandatory title defense in Las Vegas. Page fought for the Vacant WBA Welterweight Title yet again, against Andrew Lewis in 2001. Page lost via TKO in the 7th round. He retired after the bout.

Troubles outside the ring

2001 arrest

Page was arrested in December 2001, 45 minutes after he robbed a Bank of America Branch in Atlanta. Police said they saw his 1999 Cadillac, which he bought with his championship earnings, parked outside a bar four miles from the bank. They found almost $6,000 in his pocket.

Earlier that day, Page had attempted to rob another bank, according to court records, which said he also robbed an Alpharetta bank a week earlier. Page had previous convictions for robbery and drug offenses. He was sentenced to 11 years in Federal prison.

Failed boxing comeback attempt in 2012 after release

After getting relicensed by the California State Boxing Commission, Page was knocked out in the second round of a failed comeback attempt in November 2012 by  Rahman Mustafa Yusubov.

2013 arrest

On June 10, 2013, Page, whose stint in prison had not reformed him, was arrested in West Oakland, California, as a result of the “button-down bandit” serial bank robber investigation. The "button-down bandit" was charged in connection with six bank robberies in the East San Francisco Bay Area between March and June 2013. In each robbery, the robber wore various button-down, collared, long-sleeved shirts, leading investigators to dub the suspect the “button-down bandit.” Surveillance photographs were disseminated to law enforcement agencies and the public during the investigation and led a police officer in Oakley to identify Page. The officer had previous law enforcement contact with Page during his patrols, according to the FBI. Page was arrested in connection with the robbing of two Chase Banks, three Wells Fargo Banks, two U.S. banks, and a Bank of America across the East Bay. According to Claycord.com, Page was booked into the Martinez Detention Facility (MDF). With his new arrest, and the overwhelming evidence against him which will lead to another lengthy prison term, Page's boxing career is likely over.

2014

On August 19, Page pleaded guilty to the San Francisco Bay Area bank robberies in February.A judge sentenced him to 7 years in prison

Professional boxing record

See also 
 List of WBA world champions

References

External links 
 

1971 births
People from Pittsburg, California
Boxers from California
Living people
Welterweight boxers
World boxing champions
American male boxers